Kaharole is an upazila of Dinajpur District in the Division of Rangpur, Bangladesh.

Geography
Kaharole upazila is bounded by Birganj upazila on the north, Dinajpur sadar and Biral upazilas on south, Khansama and Dinajpur Sadar upazilas on the east, and Bochaganj upazila on the west.

It has 22448 households and total area 205.54 km2.

Demographics
As of the 1991 Bangladesh census, Kaharole has a population of 118379. Males constitute 51.78% of the population, and females 48.22%. This Upazila's eighteen up population is 60240.

Administration
Kaharole, which was formed in 1904 as a Thana, was turned into an upazila in 1984.

Kaharole Upazila is divided into six union parishads: Dabor, Mukundapur, Ramchandrapur, Rasulpur, Sundarpur, and Targaon. The union parishads are subdivided into 153 mauzas and 152 villages.

References

Upazilas of Dinajpur District, Bangladesh